Somatidia latula is a species of beetle in the family Cerambycidae. It was described by Broun in 1893. It contains the varietas Somatidia latula var. obesula.

References

latula
Beetles described in 1893